Vikarabad district is a district in the Indian state of Telangana. Vikarabad is the headquarters of the district..The district shares boundaries with Sangareddy, Mahabubnagar, Narayanpet, Rangareddy districts and the state boundary of Karnataka.

Geography 
This district is bounded by Sangareddy district in the north, Rangareddy district in the east, Mahbubnagar district in the south and Karnataka in the west.

Demographics 
 Census of India, the district has a population of 927,140.

Administrative divisions 
The district will have two revenue divisions of Tandur and Vikarabad. It is sub-divided into 18 mandals.Smt Nikhila I.A.S. is the present collector of the district.

See also 
 List of districts in Telangana

References

External links 

 Official website
Vikarabad district

 
Districts of Telangana